θ Trianguli Australis, Latinized as Theta Trianguli Australis, is a single star in the southern constellation of Triangulum Australe. It is visible to the naked eye as a dim, yellow-hued star with an apparent visual magnitude of +5.50. The star is located about 334 light years from the Sun based on parallax, and is drifting further away with a radial velocity of +10 km/s.

This is an evolved G/K-type giant star with a stellar classification of G8-K0 III. The star is radiating 79 times the Sun's luminosity from its photosphere at an effective temperature of 5,039 K.

References

G-type giants
K-type giants
Triangulum Australe
Trianguli Australis, Theta
Durchmusterung objects
148890
081252
6151